South East London may refer to:

SE postcode area
South of the River Thames east of Tower Bridge
South East (London sub region), a sub region of the London Plan created in 2004 and corresponding to Southwark, Lewisham, Greenwich, Bexley and Bromley
Eastern part of South London
London South East (European Parliament constituency)